Forest Hill Historic District may refer to:

Forest Hill Historic District (Newark, New Jersey), listed on the National Register of Historic Places (NRHP) in Essex County
Forest Hill Historic District (Cleveland, Ohio), listed on the National Register of Historic Places in Cuyahoga County
Forest Hill Historic District (Cleveland Heights, Ohio), listed on the National Register of Historic Places in Cuyahoga County
Forest Hill Historic District (Richmond, Virginia), listed on the NRHP in Richmond

See also
Forest Hill (disambiguation)